Somon Makhmadbekov (born 24 March 1999) is a Tajikistani judoka.

He is one of the bronze medalists of the 2019 Judo Grand Slam Osaka in the -73 kg weight category. He competed in the men's 73 kg event at the 2020 Summer Olympics in Tokyo, Japan.

References

External links
 
 
 

1999 births
Living people
Tajikistani male judoka
Judoka at the 2020 Summer Olympics
Olympic judoka of Tajikistan
20th-century Tajikistani people
21st-century Tajikistani people